The Finnish National Badminton Championships is a tournament organized to crown the best badminton players in Finland.

The tournament started in 1955.

Past winners

References
Badminton Europe - Details of affiliated national organisations
Badminton Finland Yearbook

Badminton tournaments in Finland
National badminton championships
Sports competitions in Finland
Recurring sporting events established in 1955
Badminton
1955 establishments in Finland